Kepler-23 is a star in the northern constellation of Cygnus, the swan, that is orbited by a planet found to be unequivocally within the star's habitable zone. With an apparent visual magnitude of 14.0, this star is too faint to be seen with the naked eye.

Planetary system
Planets b and c were discovered in 2011 and were confirmed in 2012. An additional planet d was discovered in 2014.

References

 
Cygnus (constellation)
G-type main-sequence stars
168
Planetary transit variables
Planetary systems with three confirmed planets
J19365254+4928452